Ideonella is a genus of bacteria in the family Comamonadaceae.

Applications

Ideonella sakaiensis

In 2016 I. sakaiensis was shown to degrade PET, a polymer widely used in food containers, bottles and synthetic fibers. Adhered to a low-grade PET film, the bacteria used two novel enzymes, PETase and MHETase, to decompose the plastic into two environmentally benign substances, which served as their main food source.

A colony of I. sakaiensis could completely degrade a low-grade plastic water bottle in six weeks. Higher-grade PET products would require heating and cooling to weaken it before bacteria could start eating.

The bacteria could also be used to reduce industrial waste during plastics manufacturing.

References

Comamonadaceae
Bacteria genera
Recycling